Mayer-Vietoris may refer to:

 Mayer–Vietoris axiom
 Mayer–Vietoris sequence